Han Bo-bae (born March 4, 1994) is a South Korean actress. Han began her career as a child actress, and has starred in films and television series such as The World of Silence (2006), A Company Man (2012), Total Messed Family (2014), Last Scandal (2008) and My Pitiful Sister (2008).

Filmography

Film

Television series

Awards and nominations

References

External links 
 Han Bo-bae  at Broomstick Entertainment
 
 
 

1994 births
Living people
South Korean child actresses
South Korean television actresses
South Korean film actresses
Inha University alumni